Rockheim (also called Det nasjonale opplevelsessenteret for pop og rock, The National Discovery Centre for Pop and Rock, and Det nasjonale museet for populærmusikk, The National Museum for Popular Music) is Norway's national museum for popular music from the 1950s to the present. It is a division of Museene i Sør-Trøndelag (Sør-Trøndelag Museums) and is housed in a former grain warehouse in Trondheim. It opened in 2010; since 2013, the director has been Sissel Guttormsen. The museum also has a virtual presence, Virtuelle Rockheim, which launched in 2009, and since 2011 musicians and groups have been chosen for the Rockheim Hall of Fame.

History and administration
The idea for the museum goes back to 1998; the Ministry of Culture began planning eight years later and in 2007 Bratterøkaia AS won the commission to create it. It was to have opened in 2009, but completion of the building was delayed by a contractor bankruptcy and a fire. It officially opened on 5 August 2010.

Rockheim is housed in a 1919 grain warehouse in Trondheim. To roughly double the space available, a new sixth floor was added in the form of a cantilevered 'box', which is clad in glass decorated with reproductions of album covers and with changeable back-lighting provided by 13,000 individually controllable LEDs; the public can affect the colours by using cellphones. A "black box" building for performances was also added; the design envisaged this being covered by climbing plants. The conversion was awarded the City of Trondheim's 2010 building award. The building has  of floor space, of which half is exhibit space. The building and installations cost 300 million kroner.

The museum is a division of Museene i Sør-Trøndelag. It was headed by Arvid Esperø during planning and construction and until 2011, when Petter Myhr became the director; he was succeeded in 2013 by Sissel Guttormsen.

Permanent and virtual exhibits
The primary mission of the museum is to preserve and document Norwegian popular music. The permanent exhibit, for which the lead designer was Canadian Stacey Spiegel, takes the form of a journey through Norwegian music and cultural history from the 1950s to the present. It occupies  in the building's top-floor box, and devotes a room to each decade. The exhibition has many interactive components. Visitors first encounter an interactive map of Norway, can select the videos shown in each room, and there are three discovery rooms: in the Ronni Room they can try playing guitar with guidance from Ronni Le Tekrø, and in the Hiphop Room they can experiment with DJing, graffiti art and breakdancing. In Virtuelle Rockheim, launched on 21 August 2009, they can manipulate an avatar to explore a selection of the exhibits in 3D. Spiegel, who also designed the virtual museum, predicted in 2008 that Rockheim would be "the world's most technically sophisticated virtual museum"; it was Norway's first online museum.

Temporary exhibitions
The museum opened with a temporary exhibition of photographs by Robert Meyer titled Icons of the 60's. Other temporary exhibitions have been Jukeboks! (jukebox), Wenches Verden (on Wenche Myhre), Innenfor/utenfor (inside/outside; photographs by Peter Beste) and Teigens Tivoli (on Jahn Teigen).

Hall of Fame
The Rockheim Hall of Fame honours individuals and groups for their contributions to Norwegian popular music. Inductees must have debuted at least 25 years before and are chosen annually by a jury. a-ha, Åge Aleksandersen, Jokke & Valentinerne, Wenche Myhre and Alf Prøysen were the first to be inducted, on 5 September 2011.

See also 
 List of music museums

References

External links

 Official website 
 Official website (English)
 Virtuelle Rockheim

Museums in Trondheim
Museums established in 2009
Rock music museums
2009 establishments in Norway
Music organisations based in Norway